The men's moguls event in freestyle skiing at the 1998 Winter Olympics in Nagano took place from 8 to 11 February at Iizuna Kogen Ski Area.

Results

Qualification
The top 16 advanced to the final.

Final

References

External links
Sports-Reference - 1998 Men's Moguls

Men's freestyle skiing at the 1998 Winter Olympics